Hindlow railway station was opened for goods in 1833 near to Hindlow near King Sterndale to the south east of Buxton, Derbyshire on the Cromford and High Peak Railway (which ran from Whaley Bridge to Cromford) and the LNWR line to Ashbourne and the south.

History
The Cromford and High Peak Railway goods station opened in 1833. It was opened for passengers in 1856 but closed in 1877.

A new station was opened in 1894 by the LNWR when it built its branch to Ashbourne from a junction at Parsley Hay

At this time the C&HPR line to Whaley Bridge was closed. Just before the station there was a junction to a stub of the old line which continued to serve the Hillhead branch. The junction was known as the Buxton and High Peak Junction, not to be confused with High Peak Junction at the other end of the C&HPR near Cromford.

Like all the stations on the line the platforms and buildings were of timber construction. Regular passenger services on the line finished on Saturday 30 October 1954. Occasional special passenger trains used the station until 7 October 1963 when the station was closed completely. The station was removed in 1966.

At Hindlow was a sidings for Ryan, Somerville and Company, and another for W.Spencer and Company (later Buxton Lime Firms Ltd.) These were two of the many lime works served by this stretch of line, which covered everything with a patina of white powder which on many photographs from this era is mistaken for snow. This section still exists, serving the lime works at Dowlow.

After a fairly easy stretch of 1 in 330 from Beswick's Sidings, the line began to climb again at 1 in 60 through Hindlow Tunnel to the summit at Brigg's Sidings and Dowlow Halt

Image gallery

Route

See also
 Cromford and High Peak Railway

References

Bibliography
 Bentley, J.M., Fox, G.K., (1997) Railways of the High Peak: Buxton to Ashbourne (Scenes From The Past series 32), Romiley: Foxline Publishing

Disused railway stations in Derbyshire
Peak District
Railway stations in Great Britain opened in 1856
Railway stations in Great Britain closed in 1954
Former London and North Western Railway stations